Hasina Safi (born 1974) is an Afghan politician, human rights activist, and former  Minister of Women's Affairs.

Early life 
She was born in Laghman in 1974. She succeeded in obtaining a diploma with an interest in political science in the field of law and political science. She is fluent in Dari, Pashto, Urdu and English.

References

1974 births
Living people
Afghan women activists